Soda Spring Valley is a valley in the U.S. state of Nevada.

Soda Spring Valley is named for the mineral springs within the valley.

References

Valleys of Mineral County, Nevada